Stenotosaurus is an extinct genus of capitosaurian temnospondyl within the family Stenotosauridae. It is known from three species, all of which lived during the Anisian stage of the Middle Triassic. Fossils have been found in England and Germany.

References

Triassic temnospondyls of Europe
Taxa named by Alfred Romer
Fossil taxa described in 1947
Anisian life